The İske Taş or Iske Tash Mosque, also the Old Stone Mosque (via , , Starokamennaya, Iske-Tash) or the Mosque of the Old Stone (via ), formerly known as The Ninth Cathedral Mosque, The Big Stone Mosque, is a mosque in Kazan, Russia.

History
According to the old legend, it was erected on the place of a communal grave of the fighting men who defended Kazan in 1552. The grave was marked by a big old stone (zur iske taş), which has been preserved in front of the east facade of the mosque for many years after its erection.

The mosque was built in 1802 with donations of merchant Ğabdulla Ütämişev. The qibla of the mosque was set by Ghabdennasir Qursawi. In 1830 it was reconstructed according to the project of Alexander Schmidt. The mosque's façades were rebuilt in classicism traditions. Their strictness is accentuated by the minaret with three tiers set on a thick cross wall between the praying rooms. The minarets' shape is associated with the minarets in the ancient towns Bolghar and Kasimov. The mosque is two-storied, has two halls, the minaret is placed in the center of gable roof. 

In the 19th century the imams were from Amirkhan family.

The mosque was closed according to the decision of Central Executive Committee of Tatar ASSR at the end of the 1930s. It was used as a school and then as storage during the Soviet rule. In 1994 it was returned to the believers.

See also
Islam in Tatarstan
Islam in Russia
List of mosques in Russia
List of mosques in Europe

References

External links

 Russian mosques

Mosques in Kazan
Religious buildings and structures completed in 1802
Closed mosques in the Soviet Union
Mosques in Russia
Mosques in Europe
Cultural heritage monuments of federal significance in Tatarstan